Financial District is a Metromover station in the Brickell neighborhood of Downtown, Miami, Florida.

The station is located near the intersection of Southeast 14th Street and Brickell Avenue, just one block east of South Miami Avenue and south of Coral Way. It opened to service May 26, 1994 and is the southern terminus of the people mover system. This station marks the beginning and end of the line for the Brickell loop. After a train reaches this final station, the train will return to complete another full loop around the neighborhoods of Brickell and Downtown Miami.

Station layout
The platform is a half-island design with the tracks running along the north end, providing only a one-side loading and unloading platform.

Places of interest
Brickell
Four Seasons Tower
Regions Bank Tower
Espirito Santo Plaza
City National Bank of Florida
Pacific National Bank
One Broadway
Jade Residences Tower
Emerald at Brickell
Solaris at Brickell
The Club at Brickell Bay
The Sail Tower
1450 Brickell (Park Place at Brickell)
1450 Brickell Building
1200 Interterra Building 
1221 Brickell Building 
1390 Brickell Building 
Infinity II
1395 Brickell Building 
1401 Brickell Building 
1428 Brickell Building 
1443 Brickell Gateway 
20 Broadway Building
40 Broadway Building
60 Broadway Building
Santa Maria
Acqua Restaurant
Gordon Biersch Brewery
HSBC Bank Building
Villa Magna Towers
Coral Station at Brickell

External links
 
 MDT – Metromover Stations
 Brickell Avenue entrance from Google Maps Street View
 Miami Avenue entrance from Google Maps Street View

Brickell Loop
Metromover stations
Railway stations in the United States opened in 1994
1994 establishments in Florida